Saisho Atsushi (22 December 1827 – 21 June 1910) was a samurai, viscount, governor, senator and member of the Privy Council of Japan. He was the adoptive father of Japanese writer Murakami Namiroku and thus the great-grandfather of the assassin Otoya Yamaguchi. Atsushi was renowned for his stubbornness and was considered one of the Satsuma Clan's Three Greats, along with Takamori Saigo and Toshimichi Okubo. He was a leader within the clan.

Early life
He was born as the second son of Saisho Atsunori of the Satsuma clan. He had a poor quality of life as a small child, but when his older brother was favored by Hisamitsu Shimazu as the head priest of Kissho-in Temple, his life dramatically improved.

The Daimyo of the area he resided in Shimazu Nariakira saw potential in him, and gave him high-trust roles early on. He was made the official warehouse secretary of Mishima and the district treasurer. When the shogunate invited Dutch naval officers to establish the Nagasaki Naval Training Center, Nariakira selected just over ten samurai from Satsuma. Atsushi was one of the few who were selected. He later met Saigō Takamori, widely known as The Last Samurai, and the two befriended through their military endeavors.

Military service
Atsushi went on various military expeditions alongside Saigō Takamori. During the events prior to the First Chōshū expedition, Atsushi, along with Takamori and Takamori's younger brother Kōhei assisted in the defense of the Imperial Palace. Rounds of cannon fire were exchanged between the forces. The three were nearly overrun, however, reinforcements were brought in and Chōshū's forces were forced to retreat. Atsushi, and the other two would sustain non-life-threatening injuries from the battle.

Atsushi, alongside Saigō went on a diplomatic excursion to rebel-held Shimonoseki in an attempt to win the trust of loyalists, and to negotiate the release of five nobles. The move carried great risk but they considered the move necessary to winning the trust of loyalists in the area. They met were able to begin diplomatic talks. The negotiations ended without violence. The five nobles were transferred to the Fukuoka domain in Kyushu, a territory considered to be neutral. The caravan were guarded by soldiers from five domains. The five were transported without incident. Peace was successfully negotiated, and the expedition against Chōshū disbanded without further incident.

Honors
Court Ranks
 20 October 1886 — Junior Third Rank 
 30 June 1894 — Senior Third Rank
 21 June 1910 — Senior Second Rank

Military awards
 25 November 1887 — Second Class Order of the Rising Sun
 25 November 1889 — Meiji Constitution Proclamation Commemorative Medal 
 26 December 1903 — First Class Order of the Sacred Treasure
 1 April 1906 — First Class Grand Cordon of the Order of the Rising Sun

References

1827 births
1910 deaths